The 1935–36 Ranji Trophy was the second season of the Ranji Trophy. It was contested between 16 teams in a knockout format. Bombay defeated Madras in the final. In this season the original name of the tournament 'The Cricket Championship of India' was changed and Ranji trophy was given.

Highlights
 S. M. Kadri scored hundreds in both innings for Bombay against Western India.

Zonal Matches

South Zone

West Zone

East Zone

North Zone

Inter-Zonal Knockout Stage

Final

Scorecards and averages
Cricketarchive

References

External links

1936 in Indian cricket
Indian domestic cricket competitions